Celine Tendobi (born 1974) is a Congolese doctor of obstetrics and gynecology with a specialty in gynecology and ultrasound.

Early life and education 
Celine Tendobi was born in 1974 in Kinshasa, Democratic Republic of the Congo. She attended the University of Kinshasha. In 2004, she went to Spain to train as an ultrasound in Obstetrics and Gynecology from the University of Navarra Clinic in Madrid.

Career 
Tendobi works with the Monkole Hospital in Kinshasa as the head of the Gynecology Service. During the Covid-19 pandemic and shortage of medical staff in Spain, she volunteered to work for University of Navarra Clinic. She returned to Monkole Hospital where she worked at the Congo's Covid Center during the lockdown.

Awards and honors 
 Harambee Prize 2014
 Guadalupe Scholarship
 Harambee Spain Prize (2013) for the Promotion and Equality of African Women

References 

1974 births
 Date of birth missing  (living people)
20th-century African people 
20th-century women physicians
21st-century Democratic Republic of the Congo people
21st-century women physicians
Democratic Republic of the Congo gynaecologists
 Democratic Republic of the Congo women
Living people
Obstetricians
People from Kinshasa
University of Navarra alumni